The following lists events that happened during 1938 in Chile.

Incumbents
President of Chile: Arturo Alessandri (until 25 December), Pedro Aguirre Cerda

Events

September
5 September – Seguro Obrero massacre

October
25 October – Chilean presidential election, 1938

Births 
date unknown – Óscar Hahn
18 January – Manuel Rodríguez (footballer) (d. 2018)
2 February – Sergio Ortega (d. 2003)
2 March – Ricardo Lagos
21 May – Luis Hernán Álvarez (d. 1991)
7 June – Armando Tobar (d. 2016)
7 October – Carlos Contreras (footballer, born 1938) (d. 2020)
9 October – Humberto Donoso (d. 2000)
7 November – Eugenio Pizarro
25 November – Alberto Valentini (d. 2009)
20 December – Patricio Rodríguez (d. 2020)

Deaths
22 May – Víctor Morales (Chilean footballer)
25 July – Luis Altamirano

References 

 
Years of the 20th century in Chile
Chile